Rose City or City of Roses may refer to:

Official place names 
 Rose City, Michigan, United States
 A town in Douglas County, Minnesota, United States
 Rose City, Texas, United States

Place nicknames

Canada
Camrose, Alberta
Welland, Ontario
Windsor, Ontario

United States
Little Rock, Arkansas
Chico, California
Pasadena, California
Norwich, Connecticut
Thomasville, Georgia
Pana, Illinois
Richmond, Indiana
Cape Girardeau, Missouri
Madison, New Jersey
Portland, Oregon
 Rose City Park, Portland, Oregon
Tyler, Texas
Lovell, Wyoming

Other places
 Përmet, Albania
 Benalla, Victoria, Australia
 Panguipulli, Chile
 Petra, Jordan
 Shiraz, Iran
 Guadalajara, Mexico
 Marrakech, Morocco
 Palmerston North, New Zealand
 Molde, Norway
 Barnaul, Russia
 Ta'if, Saudi Arabia
 Bloemfontein, South Africa
 Visby, Gotland, Sweden
 Isparta, Turkey

Other uses 
 SS Rose City, an oil tanker launched in 1976
 Rose City (soccer), a defunct New Zealand football club
 Rose City Transit, a defunct bus transportation company in Portland, Oregon, United States
 Rose City (album), a 2009 album by Viva Voce
 The Rose City, a 2001 book of short stories by David Ebershoff